Map of the Earth may refer to:

 World map, map of world areas, population, volcanoes, etc.
 Political map, map showing regional boundaries

See also
 Nap-of-the-earth